Brien Cobcroft (1934–2010) was an Australian equestrian. He won a bronze medal in team eventing at the 1968 Summer Olympics in Mexico City.

References

External links
 

1934 births
2010 deaths
Australian male equestrians
Olympic equestrians of Australia
Olympic bronze medalists for Australia
Equestrians at the 1964 Summer Olympics
Equestrians at the 1968 Summer Olympics
Olympic medalists in equestrian
Medalists at the 1968 Summer Olympics
20th-century Australian people